La Belle Russe is a 1919 American silent romantic drama film directed by Charles Brabin and starring Theda Bara, Warburton Gamble, Marian Stewart, Robert Lee Keeling, William B. Davidson, and Alice Wilson. It is based on the 1882 play of the same name by David Belasco, which was previously adapted for the screen in 1914. The film was released by Fox Film Corporation on September 21, 1919.

Plot

Cast
Theda Bara as Fleurette Sackton / La Belle Russe
Warburton Gamble as Phillip Sackton
Marian Stewart as Phillip Sackton Jr.
Robert Lee Keeling as Sir James Sackton
William B. Davidson as Brand
Alice Wilson as Lady Sackton
Robert Vivian as Butler
Lewis Broughton

Preservation
The film is now considered lost, being among the films whose last copies, were destroyed in the 1937 Fox vault fire, like most of Theda Bara's filmography.

See also
List of lost films

References

External links

1919 romantic drama films
American romantic drama films
1919 films
American silent feature films
American black-and-white films
Fox Film films
Lost American films
American films based on plays
Films directed by Charles Brabin
Lost romantic drama films
1919 lost films
1910s American films
Silent romantic drama films
Silent American drama films